Francis Xavier Leray (April 20, 1825 – September 23, 1887) was a French-born prelate of the Roman Catholic Church who served as bishop of the Diocese of Natchitoches in Louisianan (1877–1879) and as archbishop of the Archdiocese of New Orleans (1883–1887).

Biography

Early life 
Leray was born on April 20, 1825, in Châteaugiron, Ille-et-Vilaine, in France to René and Marie (née Roncin) Leray. He studied at the College of Rennes in Rennes, France, from 1833 until 1844, when he accepted a recruiting appeal for missionaries in Louisiana. Following his arrival in the United States, Leray taught for several months at Spring Hill College in Mobile, Alabama, then entered St. Mary's Seminary in Baltimore, Maryland, to complete his theological studies.

Priesthood 
In 1852, Leray accompanied Bishop John J. Chanche to Natchez, Mississippi, where Leray was ordained to priesthood on March 19, 1952.

He then served as pastor of the parish in Jackson, Mississippi, ministering to the sick and dying there during the yellow fever epidemics of 1853 and 1855. Leray himself was stricken by the fever and barely recovered. In 1857, he was named pastor of the parish in Vicksburg, Mississippi, where he built the first Catholic church and in 1860 introduced the Sisters of Mercy to establish a school. 

During the American Civil War (1861-1865), Leray served as a chaplain to the Confederate Army of Tennessee. On several occasions, he was taken prisoner by Union Army troops, but was released as soon as he was identified as a priest. After the war, he returned to Vicksburg, which was visited by cholera in 1867. He was appointed vicar general of Diocese of Natchez in 1871.

Bishop of Natchitoches 
On November 27, 1876, Leray was appointed the second bishop of the Diocese of Natchitoches, by Pope Pius IX. He received his episcopal consecration in France on April 22, 1877 from Cardinal Geoffroy Brossais Saint-Marc, with Bishop Hailandière and Charles Nouvel de La Flèche serving as co-consecrators, at Rennes Cathedral in Rennes.

Coadjutor Archbishop and Archbishop of New Orleans 
Leray remained in Natchitoches for only two years, being named Coadjutor Archbishop of New Orleans and Titular Archbishop of Ionopolis on October 23, 1879. He was also charged with the administration of the financial affairs of the Archdiocese, which was left nearly $600,000 in debt from the war; he managed to reduce this debt by at least half.

Upon the death of Archbishop Napoléon-Joseph Perché, Leray succeeded him as the third Archbishop of New Orleans on December 28, 1883. He received the pallium, a vestment worn by metropolitan bishops, from Cardinal James Gibbons in January 1884. Leray attended the Third Plenary Council of Baltimore in November 1884, and continued his efforts to relieve New Orleans of its immense debt for the rest of his tenure. An advocate of Catholic education, he increased the number of parochial schools from 36 to 70 during his administration as well. In the hope of strengthening his failing health, he returned in 1887 to his native Châteaugiron, where he died shortly afterwards at age 62.

References

Episcopal succession

1825 births
1887 deaths
Roman Catholic archbishops of New Orleans
Breton bishops
Confederate States Army chaplains
French emigrants to the United States
French Roman Catholic priests
People from Ille-et-Vilaine
Catholic Church in Mississippi
Foreign Confederate military personnel
Roman Catholic bishops of Alexandria
19th-century Roman Catholic archbishops in the United States